Preganziol is a comune (municipality) in the Province of Treviso in the Italian region Veneto, located about  northwest of Venice and about  south of Treviso.

Preganziol borders the following municipalities: Casale sul Sile, Casier, Mogliano Veneto, Treviso, Zero Branco.

References

External links
 Official website

Cities and towns in Veneto